Roland Orzabal (born Roland Jaime Orzabal de la Quintana; 22 August 1961) is a British musician, singer-songwriter, record producer, and author. He is best known as a co-founder of Tears for Fears, of which he is the main songwriter and joint vocalist. Orzabal has been the only constant member of the band, having appeared on every Tears for Fears studio album. He has also achieved success as a producer of artists such as Oleta Adams. In 2014, Orzabal published his first novel, a romantic comedy.

Early life
Orzabal was born in Portsmouth, Hampshire. He was initially raised in nearby Havant. Orzabal's father, George Orzabal de la Quintana, was a Frenchman of Argentinian and Spanish roots and was often so ill that he was rarely seen by his children.  Orzabal began writing songs when he was 7 years old. The family later moved to Bath, where he attended Culverhay School (now Bath Community Academy) and became a member of the Zenith Youth Theatre Company.

Career

Early career
Orzabal met Curt Smith while both were in their early teens in Bath, Somerset. In the late 1970s, they formed a mod music group, Graduate, along with three other members. Following the release of their debut album, Acting My Age, the group disbanded. Orzabal and Smith briefly joined Neon and then went on to form Tears for Fears, a new wave music/synthpop outfit directly inspired by the writings of the American psychologist Arthur Janov. Orzabal sings and plays guitar for the band, while Smith sings and plays bass guitar. Orzabal is also the band's main songwriter.

The band's debut album, The Hurting (1983), reached number one on the UK Albums Chart. Their second album, Songs from the Big Chair (1985), reached number one on the US Billboard 200, achieving multi-platinum status in both the UK and the US. Songs from the Big Chair included two Billboard Hot 100 number one hits: "Shout" and "Everybody Wants to Rule the World".

After the release of their third album, The Seeds of Love (1989), Smith and Orzabal split in 1991. Orzabal continued recording under the Tears for Fears name, releasing the albums Elemental (1993) and Raoul and the Kings of Spain (1995). As Tears for Fears, Orzabal and Smith released Everybody Loves a Happy Ending in 2004. After almost a decade in development, the band's seventh album, The Tipping Point, was released in February 2022.

Solo work

In 2001, Orzabal released his first solo album, Tomcats Screaming Outside, under his own name.

Work as a producer/songwriter
As a songwriter, Orzabal is a three-time Ivor Novello Award winner. His first award was in 1986 for "Songwriter of the Year" following the release of Tears for Fears' second album Songs from the Big Chair.

Orzabal and Smith were responsible for discovering pianist/vocalist Oleta Adams, whom they invited to collaborate on their 1989 album The Seeds of Love. Adams appeared on several tracks on the album, most notably the hit single "Woman in Chains", which she performed as a duet with Orzabal. Orzabal then co-produced Adams' album Circle of One (1990). The album reached No. 1 in the UK and No. 20 in the US, and featured her transatlantic top ten hit "Get Here". Orzabal also co-wrote the lead track "Rhythm of Life" for the album, which was originally intended for The Seeds of Love. As well as playing guitar and singing backing vocals on the track, he also appeared in the song's accompanying promo video.

In 1999, Orzabal co-produced Icelandic singer-songwriter Emiliana Torrini's album Love in the Time of Science, along with Tears for Fears associate Alan Griffiths. The pair also wrote two tracks for the album.

Orzabal wrote the song "Mad World", recorded by Michael Andrews and Gary Jules for the film soundtrack Donnie Darko in 2001. Their version was released as a single in 2003 and became the Christmas number one single in the UK that year, ultimately becoming the year's biggest-selling single. The song was originally composed by Orzabal and was Tears for Fears' first hit single in 1982. In 2004, the song won Orzabal his second Ivor Novello Award; he was awarded as the songwriter of the Best Selling UK Single of 2003. In September 2021, Orzabal was awarded his third Ivor Novello Award along with Curt Smith for the Outstanding Song Collection by Tears for Fears.

Novel
Orzabal wrote a novel, a romantic comedy entitled Sex, Drugs & Opera, published in 2014. It tells the story of a middle-aged pop star, Solomon Capri, who is semi-retired but is approached to take part in the reality show Popstar to Operastar. Capri sees the show as a way to rejuvenate his career and his waning marriage. The story was inspired by Orzabal's own experience; he was approached by the ITV show himself, though did not take part.

Personal life

Relationships
In 1982, Orzabal married Caroline Johnston, whom he had been dating since his teenage years. Caroline sang the child vocal on the Tears for Fears song "Suffer the Children" from the band's debut album The Hurting, and also drew the hands cover artwork for the 1983 re-release of "Pale Shelter". Roland and Caroline Orzabal had two sons. Caroline Orzabal died in July 2017 aged 54 after suffering from alcoholism-related dementia and cirrhosis, which came about after her menopause led to depression. Her death led the band to cancel its remaining tour dates that year. 

In April 2022, Orzabal married Emily Rath, a photographer and writer.

Politics
After the re-election of Margaret Thatcher in June 1987, Orzabal took interest in socialism. He then wrote the lyrics "Politician granny with your high ideals, have you no idea how the majority feels?" in the song "Sowing the Seeds of Love".

Residences
Orzabal has a house in the Hollywood Hills, about 3 miles from bandmate Curt Smith. He also has a house in England.

Discography

Solo albums
Tomcats Screaming Outside (2001)

with Graduate
Acting My Age (1980)

with Tears for Fears
The Hurting (1983)
Songs from the Big Chair (1985)
The Seeds of Love (1989)
Elemental (1993)
Raoul and the Kings of Spain (1995)
Everybody Loves a Happy Ending (2004)
The Tipping Point (2022)

with Mancrab
"Fish for Life" (1986)

References

1961 births
Living people
20th-century English singers
21st-century English singers
APRA Award winners
English male singers
English new wave musicians
English record producers
English rock singers
English socialists
English songwriters
Ivor Novello Award winners
Male new wave singers
Musicians from Portsmouth
Neon (British band) members
People from Havant
Tears for Fears members
English people of Argentine descent
English people of French descent
English people of Spanish descent
Graduate (band) members